Crystal Leefmans (born 6 January 1995) is a Surinamese badminton player. In 2010, she won the bronze medals at the Medellín South American Games in the mixed doubles and team event. In 2011, she won the mixed doubles title at the Carebaco International tournament in the individuals event of the Carebaco Games partnered with Mitchel Wongsodikromo. Leefmans was also the champion at the Suriname International tournament in 2012 and 2013. In 2018 she won the mixed doubles Carebaco International title again at home, this time partnering compatriot Dylan Darmohoetomo. She was the flagbearer for Suriname at the 2011 Pan Am Games.

Career 
Crystal Leefmans, who originates from Badminton Club Lelydorp and switched to club TNF after moving to the capital city of Paramaribo, was voted Female Badminton Player of the year in Suriname in 2010, 2012, 2013, 2014 & 2015.
After winning many National juniors titles, Crystal won her first of a total of five National Women's singles titles in 2009 at the Surinamese National Badminton Championships. She held on to her title in 2010, then lost it to Danielle Melchiot the following year, but regained her singles title in 2012 to lose it again to Melchiot the following year 2013. In 2014 she took her fourth singles title and defended this one successfully in 2015. Crystal Leefmans also holds five National Women's doubles titles (2009, 2012, 2014, 2015 and 2017) and three National Mixed doubles titles (2010, 2012 & 2014). With these achievements she is holder of two National Triple crowns in 2012 and 2014.

Achievements

South American Games 
Mixed doubles

BWF International Series/ Future Series (5 titles, 10 runner-up) 
Women's singles

Women's doubles

Mixed doubles

  BWF International Challenge tournament
  BWF International Series tournament
  BWF Future Series tournament

National badminton titles 
 2017 - National Championships : Women Doubles Gold
 2017 - National Championships : Mixed Doubles Silver
 2015 - National Championships : Women Singles Gold
 2015 - National Championships : Women Doubles Gold
 2014 - National Championships : Women Singles Gold
 2014 - National Championships : Women Doubles Gold
 2014 - National Championships : Mixed Doubles Gold
 2012 - National Championships : Women Singles Gold
 2012 - National Championships : Women Doubles Gold
 2012 - National Championships : Mixed Doubles Gold
 2010 - National Championships : Women Singles Gold
 2010 - National Championships : Women Doubles Gold
 2010 - National Championships : Mixed Doubles Gold
 2009 - National Championships : Women Singles Gold
 2009 - National Championships : Women Doubles Gold
 2008 - National Championships : Women Singles Silver
 2008 - National Championships : Women Doubles Bronze
 2009 - Surinamese National Junior Badminton Championships Girls Singles U15  Gold
 2009 - Surinamese National Junior Badminton Championships Girls Doubles U15  Gold
 2009 - Surinamese National Junior Badminton Championships Mixed Doubles U15  Gold
 2009 - Surinamese National Junior Badminton Championships Girls Singles U19  Gold
 2009 - Surinamese National Junior Badminton Championships Girls Doubles U19  Gold
 2009 - Surinamese National Junior Badminton Championships Mixed Doubles U19 Bronze
 2008 - Surinamese National Junior Badminton Championships Girls Singles U15 Silver
 2008 - Surinamese National Junior Badminton Championships Girls Doubles U15  Gold
 2008 - Surinamese National Junior Badminton Championships Mixed Doubles U15  Gold
 2008 - Surinamese National Junior Badminton Championships Girls Doubles U19 Silver
 2008 - Surinamese National Junior Badminton Championships Mixed Doubles U19 Silver

References

External links 
 

1995 births
Living people
Sportspeople from Paramaribo
Surinamese female badminton players
Pan American Games competitors for Suriname
Badminton players at the 2011 Pan American Games
Competitors at the 2014 Central American and Caribbean Games
South American Games bronze medalists for Suriname
South American Games medalists in badminton
Competitors at the 2010 South American Games